The Abyssinian white-eye or white-breasted white-eye (Zosterops abyssinicus) is a small passerine bird belonging to the genus Zosterops in the white-eye family Zosteropidae. It is native to north-east Africa and southern Arabia.

It is 10–12 cm long. The upperparts are green; darker and greyer in northern races. There is a narrow white ring around the eye and a thin black line between the bill and eye. The underparts vary from pale yellow to greyish-white depending on the race. The bird has various twittering and buzzing calls.

In Africa it occurs from north-east Sudan south through Eritrea, Ethiopia, Somaliland and Kenya to north-east Tanzania. It is also found on Socotra Island. In Arabia it occurs in south-west Saudi Arabia, Yemen and southern Oman. It occurs in open woodland, scrub, wadis and gardens. It is found up to 1,800 metres above sea-level in Africa and 3,100 metres in Arabia. It usually forages among branches in trees but sometimes descends to ground-level. It feeds mainly on insects and will also take nectar from flowers.

Notes

References
 Hollom, P. A. D.; Porter, R. F.; Christensen, S. & Willis, Ian (1988) Birds of the Middle East and North Africa, T & AD Poyser, Calton, England.
 Sinclair, I. & Ryan, P. (2003) Birds of Africa South of the Sahara, Struik, Cape Town.
 Zimmerman, D. A.; Turner, D. A. & Pearson, D. J. (1999) Birds of Kenya & Northern Tanzania, Christopher Helm, London.

Abyssinian white-eye
Birds of the Horn of Africa
Birds of the Middle East
Abyssinian white-eye